Tana French  (born 10 May 1973) is an American-Irish writer and theatrical actress. She is a longtime resident of Dublin, Ireland. Her debut novel In the Woods (2007), a psychological mystery, won the Edgar, Anthony, Macavity, and Barry awards for best first novel. The Independent has referred to her as "the First Lady of Irish Crime".

Personal life
Tana Elizabeth French was born in Burlington, Vermont, to Elena Hvostoff-Lombardi and David French. Her father was an economist who worked on resource management for the developing world, and she lived in numerous countries as a child including Ireland, Italy, the US and Malawi.

French attended Trinity College Dublin, and trained in acting. She settled in Ireland and has lived in Dublin since 1990. French and her husband have two daughters.

Novels
French was enthralled by both acting and writing since her childhood but eventually focused more on acting. She grew up reading mystery and crime novels. She trained as a professional actor at Trinity, and she works in theatre, film, and voiceover.

In her later 30s, her passion for writing was rekindled. She began writing her debut novel in the months-long lulls between castings;
In the Woods was published in 2007 to international acclaim and received rave reviews from many publications. Publishers Weekly praised French, saying she "expertly walks the line between police procedural and psychological thriller in her debut" and that "Ryan and Maddox are empathetic and flawed heroes, whose partnership and friendship elevate the narrative beyond a gory tale of murdered children and repressed childhood trauma." It received several literary prizes, was a bestseller in hardcover and paperback, and has been termed a 'dream debut'. In 2014, Flavorwire included it in their 50 of the Greatest Debut Novels Since 1950. As of 2015 more than one million copies of In the Woods have been sold. 

The second novel, The Likeness (2008), presents the story of the first novel's co-lead, Cassie Maddox. It quickly achieved high positions on bestseller lists in various countries and stayed on The New York Times Best Seller list for several months. In its reviews of the novel, Kirkus praised its mix of "police procedures, psychological thrills and gothic romance beautifully woven into one stunning story". In an interview with The Guardian, French stated that Donna Tartt's The Secret History was an influence on The Likeness, opening up the "landscape of friendship as something worthy of exploration and something that could be powerful enough to trigger a murder."

The first six novels are part of the Dublin Murder Squad series. After publishing The Trespasser in 2016, French published two standalone novels. Both The Witch Elm and The Searcher also take place in Ireland.

Awards

Television
In 2015, Euston Films & Veritas acquired TV production rights. Sarah Phelps wrote the screenplay, which she based on both In the Woods and The Likeness, for the eight-episode series of Dublin Murders, commissioned by the BBC for BBC One and Starz, with RTÉ later joining the project. Filming commenced in 2018 in Belfast and Dublin and continued in Dublin to late February 2019. Broadcast began on BBC One on 14 October 2019, on RTÉ One on 16 October 2019, and on Starz on 10 November 2019.

References

External links

Theme issue of Clues: A Journal of Detection on “Tana French and Irish Crime Fiction” (vol. 32, no. 1, 2014)
Interview with Tana French in Shots Ezine July 2012
Be It Ever So Awful, No Place Like..., Janet Maslin, The New York Times, 11 July 2010

1973 births
Writers from Burlington, Vermont
Alumni of Trinity College Dublin
American emigrants to Ireland
Irish women novelists
Irish crime fiction writers
Women mystery writers
Irish stage actresses
Edgar Award winners
Anthony Award winners
Macavity Award winners
Barry Award winners
21st-century Irish women writers
21st-century Irish novelists
21st-century Irish actresses
Living people
Tana French